The Bank of Sparks is a bank in Sparks, Nevada. It was built in 1905 in the Romanesque Revival style. It was listed in the National Register of Historic Places in 2007.

References 

National Register of Historic Places in Washoe County, Nevada
Romanesque Revival architecture in Nevada
Commercial buildings completed in 1905
Bank buildings on the National Register of Historic Places in Nevada
1905 establishments in Nevada